Los Alamos (Spanish: Los Álamos, meaning The Cottonwoods) is a unincorporated community in Santa Barbara County, California, United States. Located in the Los Alamos Valley, the town of Los Alamos is considered to be a part of the Santa Ynez Valley community. Los Alamos is also connected to other cities Vandenberg SFB, Lompoc, Buellton, Solvang, and other Santa Barbara County cities. The population was 1,890 at the 2010 census, up from 1,372 at the 2000 census. For statistical purposes, the United States Census Bureau has defined Los Alamos as a census-designated place (CDP).

History 
In 1839, José Antonio de la Guerra, a son of José de la Guerra y Noriega received the Rancho Los Alamos Mexican land grant. The hills above Rancho Los Alamos served as a hideout for bandito, Salomon Pico, whose escapades were popularized by the character "Zorro". During the U.S.'s centennial year of 1876, Thomas Bell along with his nephew JohnS. Bell, and Dr. JamesB. Shaw (all from San Francisco), purchased acreage from Rancho Los Alamos and neighboring Rancho La Laguna. Both families allocated a half square mile from each of their new ranches to create the Los Alamos town site with "Centennial Street" as the central thoroughfare.

The Los Alamos Valley prospered and grew quickly serving as a popular stagecoach stop from 1861–1901. The Union Hotel opened in 1880 to serve overnight travelers. The narrow-gauge Pacific Coast Railway also ran to Los Alamos from San Luis Obispo between 1882–1940.  Oil was discovered at the Orcutt field in hills north of Valley in 1901, and in the Purisima Hills south of the valley at the Lompoc Oil Field in 1903, providing more economic prosperity. The town flagpole at Centennial and Bell Street was dedicated in 1918. The Chamber of Commerce was active from 1920–32 and instrumental in forming a lighting district, obtaining telephone service, street paving and mail service. Residents today still pick-up their mail from the Post Office downtown, as no street delivery is available. 

Los Alamos, California, is home to the last standing Pacific Coast Railroad Station, and is now also home to various wine tasting rooms, fine dining establishments, and antique stores.

Geography 

Los Alamos is located near the Santa Ynez Valley in the heart of the Santa Barbara wine country, on U.S. Route 101. While Los Alamos is in a narrow valley, the surrounding terrain consists of rolling hills.

Los Alamos is relatively isolated. Lompoc, California and Vandenberg Air Force Base are to the west and southwest, respectively. California State Route 135 is the main road to the base. The large Cat Canyon Oil Field is in the hills to the northeast, the Zaca Oil Field to the east-southeast, and the Orcutt Oil Field is in the hills to the northwest of the town.

San Antonio Creek passes through the town on the way to the ocean.

Climate 

This region experiences warm (but not hot) and dry summers, with no average monthly temperatures above .  According to the Köppen Climate Classification system, Los Alamos has a warm-summer Mediterranean climate, abbreviated "Csb" on climate maps.

Demographics

2010 

The 2010 United States Census reported that Los Alamos had a population of 1,890. The racial makeup of Los Alamos was 1,667 (88.2 percent) White, 5 (0.3 percent) African American, 10 (0.5 percent) Native American, 32 (1.7 percent) Asian, 0 (0.0 percent) Pacific Islander, 134 (7.1 percent) from other races, and 42 (2.2 percent) from two or more races. Hispanic or Latino of any race were 773 persons (40.9 percent).

The Census reported that 1,890 people (100 percent of the population) lived in households, 0 (0 percent) lived in non-institutionalized group quarters, and 0 (0 percent) were institutionalized.

There were 628 households, out of which 244 (38.9 percent) had children under the age of 18 living in them, 369 (58.8 percent) were opposite-sex married couples living together, 55 (8.8 percent) had a female householder with no husband present, 37 (5.9 percent) had a male householder with no wife present.  There were 30 (4.8 percent) unmarried opposite-sex partnerships, and 8 (1.3 percent) same-sex married couples or partnerships. 124 households (19.7 percent) were made up of individuals, and 28 (4.5 percent) had someone living alone who was 65 years of age or older. The average household size was 3.01.  There were 461 families (73.4 percent of all households); the average family size was 3.52.

The population was spread out, with 495 people (26.2 percent) under the age of 18, 173 people (9.2 percent) aged 18 to 24, 454 people (24.0 percent) aged 25 to 44, 589 people (31.2 percent) aged 45 to 64, and 179 people (9.5 percent) who were 65 years of age or older.  The median age was 38.2 years. For every 100 females, there were 100.2 males.  For every 100 females age 18 and over, there were 95.4 males.

The homeowner vacancy rate was 1.5 percent; the rental vacancy rate was 6.4 percent.  1,141 people (60.4 percent of the population) lived in owner-occupied housing units and 749 people (39.6 percent) lived in rental housing units.

2000 

At the 2000 census, there were 1,372 people, 471 households and 349 families residing in the CDP. The racial makeup of the CDP was 76.90 percent White, 0.22 percent African American, 1.82 percent Native American, 0.73 percent Asian, 0.51 percent Pacific Islander, 15.09 percent from other races, and 4.74 percent from two or more races. Hispanic or Latino of any race were 34.69 percent of the population.

There were 471 households, of which 44.2 percent had children under the age of 18 living with them, 58.0 percent were married couples living together, 11.3 percent had a female householder with no husband present, and 25.9 percent were non-families. 20.4 percent of all households were made up of individuals, and 6.8 percent had someone living alone who was 65 years of age or older. The average household size was 2.91 and the average family size was 3.36.

Age distribution was 31.9 percent under the age of 18, 7.7 percent from 18 to 24, 34.2 percent from 25 to 44, 19.3 percent from 45 to 64, and 7.0 percent who were 65 years of age or older. The median age was 34 years. For every 100 females, there were 102.7 males. For every 100 females age 18 and over, there were 96.0 males.

The median household income was $47,321, and the median family income was $49,125. Males had a median income of $32,206 versus $30,714 for females. The per capita income for the CDP was $18,013. About 10.3 percent of families and 13.1 percent of the population were below the poverty line, including 18.2 percent of those under age 18 and 2.2 percent of those age 65 or over.

Economy 
It is a small, unincorporated town in a region of ranches, oil fields, vegetable farms (broccoli, lettuce and strawberries), and wine grape vineyards.

The main street in Los Alamos is Bell Street, or California Route 135. Many businesses line the street, such as the historic Victorian Mansion Bed & Breakfast, an 1864 Victorian that houses six themed suites, or the Union Hotel, an old Wells Fargo stagecoach stop. The town also features antique stores such as Sister's Antiques located in the historic Leslie House, wine tasting, art galleries such as the C Gallery, and eateries such as Full of Life Flatbread, Bell's, Bob's Well Bread Bakery, Plenty on Bell, and Pico at the Los Alamos General Store.  In addition, the town also features tasting rooms for three local wineries; Bedford Winery, Casa Dumetz, Lo Fi, A Tribute To Grace, and Municipal Winemakers. Several of these eateries and wineries were featured in the summer 2012 issue of Edible Santa Barbara.

Parks and recreation
The local elementary school, Olga Reed School, is located next to Los Alamos County Park. The second park in Los Alamos is Arthur Ferrini Park, located next to the Los Alamos Market. Many locals walk or ride their bicycles around town.

Arts and culture
Los Alamos Old Days is a celebration held in September annually on Bell Street. Los Alamos Old Days is usually two days long and offers stands and booths as well as a parade that celebrates the agriculture and history around Los Alamos Valley, the Valley of the Cottonwoods. In local Spanish, "álamo" refers to Fremont Cottonwood (Populus fremontii) trees, native to the area. Many of these "cottonwoods" grew along the banks of San Antonio Creek.

In popular culture
The town was featured in Visiting... with Huell Howser Episode 1022.

References 

Census-designated places in California
Census-designated places in Santa Barbara County, California